Birkigt is a district in Freital, a town in Sächsische Schweiz-Osterzgebirge, Saxony, Germany. Formerly an independent municipality, it was absorbed by Freital in 1923.

History
The district was first mentioned in 1326. On August 24, 1944, the district was badly damaged during a U.S. air raid.

References

Former municipalities in Saxony
Freital